This is a list of flags used in or otherwise associated with Uruguay.

National Flag

Military Flags

Municipality Flags

Department Flags

Political Flags

Historical Flags

Burgees of Uruguay

See also 
 Flag of Uruguay
 Coat of arms of Uruguay

References

External links 

 

Flags of Uruguay
Lists and galleries of flags
Flags